Maud Isaacks (October 26, 1885 – January 22, 1980) was an American politician who served in the Texas House of Representatives from 1954 to 1967.

References

1885 births
1980 deaths
Democratic Party members of the Texas House of Representatives
20th-century American politicians